Akiapmin is a small town in Sandaun Province, Papua New Guinea. Its climate is Rainforest Climate. It’s located near the Ogon River, and the Big Limestone River.

Ref 

Populated places in Sandaun Province
Sandaun Province